The Shack is a 2017 American Christian drama film directed by Stuart Hazeldine and written by John Fusco, Andrew Lanham and Destin Daniel Cretton, based on the 2007 novel of the same name by William P. Young. The film stars Sam Worthington, Octavia Spencer, Graham Greene, Radha Mitchell, Alice Braga, Sumire Matsubara, Aviv Alush, and Tim McGraw.

Filming began on June 8, 2015, in Vancouver, British Columbia. The film was released in the United States on March 3, 2017, and grossed over $96 million worldwide.

Plot
Mackenzie "Mack" Phillips suffered physical and emotional abuse as a child at the hands of his drunken father, who abused his mother as well. One day, Mack tells the preacher at his church of his abuse, and as punishment, his father harshly beats him, leading to Mack's mother's decision to leave them. As a 13-year-old boy he chose to poison his father with strychnine in his whiskey.

As an adult he has a fulfilling life with his wife, Nan, and their three children: Kate, Josh and Missy. Mack's life is shattered when their youngest child Missy disappears during a camping trip while he is saving Kate and Josh during a canoeing accident. The police determine Missy is the victim of a serial killer after finding her torn dress and blood in a derelict cabin in the forest (the titular "shack"). Kate blames herself for Missy's death because she caused the canoe accident in the first place.

The tragedy derails Mack's faith and life until the onset of winter when he receives an unstamped, typewritten note inviting him to meet at the shack. The message is signed "Papa" (which was Missy's nickname for God). Thinking this may possibly be an opportunity for meeting and punishing the serial killer, Mack takes his gun, borrows his friend's SUV, and drives there, narrowly avoiding a collision with a truck on the way. Finding the shack empty, an enraged Mack is tempted to shoot himself; before he can, he encounters a mysterious figure, who leads him to the trio of strangers who invite him to stay at their house nearby.

The trio of strangers gradually reveal their identities: the African-American woman is God (Papa), the Middle-Eastern man is Jesus, and the Asian woman is the Holy Spirit. The purpose of their visit is to help Mack better understand his life as seen from a much broader context or higher perspective, the goal being to help free him from an inclination to pass judgment upon himself and others, and to help heal himself and his family after Missy's death.

Mack helps Jesus build a wooden box and helps the Holy Spirit prepare a spot in her garden for a planting. Papa—in the form of an elderly Native American man—leads him to the cave where Missy's body is located. Together they prepare her body for burial, place her in the box, and lay her to rest in the garden. Mack briefly sees Missy in Heaven, but is unable to be with her; Jesus steps through the boundary separating them to visit her. Mack also visits another cave where God's wisdom, in the form of a woman named Sophia, talks to him. Eventually, the trio and Mack encounter the spirit of Mack's father, who apologizes for his mistreatment of Mack and he reluctantly forgives him. Mack also apologizes to his father, whom he killed, and finally understands that Missy's death was not punishment for his murder of his father.

Finally able to move beyond his grief and his faith restored, he leaves the trio and sets out to return home to his family. However, he encounters the truck from before and collides with it, waking up in a hospital. The friend from whom he borrowed the SUV tells him he never reached the shack, having crashed on the way there. Later on, Mack tells Nan about what he saw on his journey and convinces Kate that whatever  happened on the canoe wasn't her fault. The film ends with Mack attending church again with his family, as the audience is left to decide whether the events that happened at the shack were real.

Cast
 Sam Worthington as Mackenzie "Mack" Phillips
Carson Reaume as Young Mackenzie "Mack" Phillips
 Octavia Spencer as God (Papa)
 Graham Greene as Male Papa
 Radha Mitchell as Nan Phillips
 Aviv Alush as Jesus Christ
 Sumire Matsubara as Holy Spirit (Sarayu)
 Tim McGraw as Willie 
 Alice Braga as Sophia 
 Megan Charpentier as Kate Phillips
 Gage Munroe as Josh Phillips
 Amélie Eve as Missy Phillips
 Ryan Robbins as Emil Ducette

Production

Forest Whitaker was once attached to direct and star in the film.

Filming
Principal photography on the film began on June 8, 2015, in Vancouver, Canada.

The camping scenes were filmed at Sunnyside campground in Cultus Lake, British Columbia, while the waterfall was filmed at Multnomah Falls, the Oregon site referenced in the source novel.

Release

Box office
The Shack grossed $57.4 million in the United States and Canada and $39.6 million in other territories for a worldwide gross of $96.9 million.

In North America, The Shack opened on March 3, 2017, alongside Before I Fall and Logan, and was projected to gross around $10 million from 2,888 theaters in its opening weekend. It made $850,000 from Thursday night previews and $5.5 million on its first day. It went on to open to $16.1 million, finishing above expectations and third at the box office behind Logan and Get Out. It dropped 38% in its second weekend, grossing $10 million and finishing 4th.

Reception

Critical response
On Rotten Tomatoes, the film has an approval rating of 21% based on 72 reviews, with an average rating of 3.9/10. The site's critical consensus reads, "The Shack undeniably worthy message is ill-served by a script that confuses spiritual uplift with melodramatic clichés and heavy-handed sermonizing." On Metacritic, the film has a weighted average score of 32 out of 100, based on 18 critics, indicating "generally unfavorable reviews". Audiences polled by CinemaScore gave the film an average grade of "A" on an A+ to F scale, while PostTrak reported filmgoers gave an 85% overall positive score and a 70% "definite recommend".

Peter Sobczynski of RogerEbert.com gave the film 1.5 stars out of 4, saying it is "both too innocuous and too off-putting for its own good". Adam Graham of The Detroit News said it "feels like an overly long church sermon". The A.V. Club said, "Most of its running time is taken with mollifying conversations between Mack and the movie's New Age-meets-Bible Belt oversimplifications of the Holy Trinity. It fits right into a long tradition of quasi-mystical pseudo-parables."

Owen Glieberman from Variety said the following about the film: The Shack' has a real chance to connect commercially, because even though its drama is mushy, at heart it's a bit of a theme-park ride: the movie in which you get to know what it's like to hang out with God and make friends with Jesus. In life, religion isn't nearly so reassuring. It's daunting, and our culture is starved for films that portray religious feeling in a way that's both reverent and truthful. 'The Shack' isn't one of them; it reduces faith to a kind of spiritual comfort food. But thanks, in part, to movies like this one, maybe that's what faith is on its way to becoming."

Conservative or religious film critics were more positive towards the film. Kathy Schiffer of the National Catholic Register wrote that "I watched The Shack not once, but twice. It was inspiring, beautifully portrayed, and thought-provoking. The love and humor and the sheer joy of the Trinity, bantering over the dinner table in the Shack, was heart-warming, and it made fresh my awareness of God's love for me." Beliefnet's Wesley Baines felt the film was successful because it resonated with the desires of its modern audience.

Controversy
Despite the positive response from conservative critics, the film attracted the same sort of controversy for unorthodox theology that the book did. Theologian Albert Mohler said the film's depiction of God the Father, Jesus Christ, and the Holy Spirit is "profoundly unbiblical". John Mulderig of Catholic News Service said the film was "an intriguing endeavor" but had many problematic elements. Catholic Bishop Robert Barron said about the book "There's a lot of sweet stuff – but you do have to spit out a few seeds." New Testament scholar James B. DeYoung said the film promotes universalism, which he characterized as heresy.

Soundtrack

The accompanying soundtrack for the film features contributions from popular artists primarily in the genres of country music and contemporary Christian music. It was released February 24, 2017 through Atlantic Records.

A new duet between Tim McGraw and Faith Hill was written and recorded for the film titled "Keep Your Eyes On Me" which is featured in the trailer. It was released digitally on January 27, 2017 as the soundtrack's first promotional single. This release was followed by Dan + Shay's promotional track, "When I Pray for You", on February 3, 2017. Christian rock band Skillet released an acoustic version of "Stars" from their album, Unleashed, in a music video for the film.

Track listing

Charts

References

External links
 
 

2017 films
2017 drama films
Films based on American novels
Films based on Canadian novels
American drama films
Summit Entertainment films
Films about religion
Films scored by Aaron Zigman
Films shot in Oregon
Films shot in Vancouver
Films about Christianity
Films set in Oregon
Films about angels
Heaven and hell films
Portrayals of Jesus in film
Lionsgate films
Films with screenplays by Andrew Lanham
Films with screenplays by Destin Daniel Cretton
Films with screenplays by John Fusco
Albums produced by TMS (production team)
2010s English-language films
2010s American films